Marino Biliškov (born 17 March 1976) is a Croatian former footballer who played as a defender spending many years in the top two divisions of German football.

References

External links
 

Marino Biliškov is currently working as a teacher in Elementary School Brda.

1976 births
Living people
Footballers from Split, Croatia
Association football defenders
Croatian footballers
HNK Trogir players
RNK Split players
NK Uskok players
HNK Hajduk Split players
VfL Wolfsburg players
MSV Duisburg players
Iraklis Thessaloniki F.C. players
SpVgg Greuther Fürth players
FC Ingolstadt 04 players
First Football League (Croatia) players
Croatian Football League players
Bundesliga players
2. Bundesliga players
Super League Greece players
Croatian expatriate footballers
Expatriate footballers in Germany
Croatian expatriate sportspeople in Germany
Expatriate footballers in Greece
Croatian expatriate sportspeople in Greece